Gregory Allen Cater (born April 17, 1957) is an American former professional football punter who played in the National Football League (NFL) for the Buffalo Bills and St. Louis Cardinals, appearing in a total of 77 career games.

References

Living people
1957 births
Buffalo Bills players
St. Louis Cardinals (football) players
American football punters
Chattanooga Mocs football players
Players of American football from Georgia (U.S. state)
People from LaGrange, Georgia
National Football League replacement players